Suresh Ambadasrao Warpudkar (born 15 July 1951) is an Indian politician who is the member of Maharashtra Legislative Assembly in 2019 from Pathri as an Indian National Congress candidate. He was also a minister of state in Government of Maharashtra and Member of Parliament in 1998 from Parbhani.

Early life and education
Warpudkar was born on 15 July 1951 in Warpud village of Parbhani District. His father, Ambadasrao Warpudkar was a farmer.

Warpudkar received his initial schooling from Warpud, He then transferred to Parbhani town, where he received most of his schooling and completed BSc in Agriculture
from Marathwada Krishi Vidyapeeth in 1972.

Personal life
Warpudkar married Meena Warpudkar on 29 June 1974, with whom he has a son and two daughters. His wife was mayor of Parbhani Municipal Corporation.

Positions held
 Member of Maharashtra Legislative Assembly (MLA) for Singnapur Assembly constituency 1986–1998 (3 terms) 
 Member of Maharashtra Legislative Assembly (MLA) for Singnapur Assembly constituency 2004–2009
 Member of Indian Parliament for Parbhani (Lok Sabha constituency) 1998–1999.
 Member, Committee on Science and Technology 1998–1999
 Environment and Forests; and its Sub-Committee on Ganga Action Plan 1998–1999
 Member, Consultative Committee, Ministry of Labour 1998–1999
 Special Invitee, Consultative Committee, Ministry of Agriculture 1998–1999
 Minister of state in Government of Maharashtra for agriculture 2008–2009
 Chairman, Parbhani Distt. Central Co-operative Bank Ltd., Parbhani
 Narshinha Sosuk Ltd. Luhgoan, Parbhani District
 Director, Maharashtra State Co-operative Bank, Mumbai
 District President Nationalist Congress Party, Parbhani

Current positions
 Member of Maharashtra Legislative Assembly (MLA) for Pathri (Vidhan Sabha constituency) 2019.
 President, District Congress Committee, Parbhani 2014.

References

1951 births
Living people
Indian National Congress politicians
Members of the Maharashtra Legislative Assembly
People from Maharashtra
People from Marathwada
People from Parbhani
People from Parbhani district
State cabinet ministers of Maharashtra